Rosappu Ravikkaikari is a 1979 Indian Tamil-language historical romance film directed by Devaraj–Mohan. A remake of the 1978 Kannada film Parasangada Gendethimma, itself based on Srikrishna Alanahalli's novella of the same name, the film stars Sivakumar, Deepa and Sivachandran, with Vinu Chakravarthy and Nagarathnamma in supporting roles. Set in British-ruled India, it revolves around a modern woman who cannot tolerate her rustic husband and her mother-in-law, and engages in an extramarital affair.

Vandichakkaram, written by Chakravarthy, was originally intended to be the 100th film for Sivakumar as an actor; however, after Chakravarthy and producer Thirupur Mani of Vivekananda Pictures saw Parasangada Gendethimma, they told Sivakumar that a remake of this film would be a better fit as his 100th film. It is the debut of screenwriter Vijay Krishnaraj (credited as Krishna), and Chakravarthy as an actor in Tamil cinema. The music was composed by Ilaiyaraaja, editing was handled by T. P. Sekar and cinematography by R. N. K. Prasad.

Rosappu Ravikkaikari was released on 18 May 1979. The film became a critical and commercial success, running for over 100 days in theatres. For his performance, Sivakumar won the Filmfare Award for Best Actor – Tamil.

Plot 
In British-ruled India, Sembattayan, a naïve and illiterate villager, is the sole breadwinner of his family in Vandicholai village, in the hills on outskirts of Salem. He makes a living by selling betel leaves, covering fast distances by foot. His mother gets him married to Nandhini, an educated and modern woman from a neighbouring village. The villagers are surprised that Sembattayan has such a wife and start suspecting her character for stooping down to the level of marrying Sembattayan, who is a complete mismatch for her. Nandhini finds it difficult to live in their home which lacks all the facilities she is accustomed to.

Sembattayan's mother harasses Nandhini and abuses her for her lifestyle and neglecting domestic duties. Unable to tolerate it after her mother brandishes Nandini, Sembattayan establishes a separate home with Nandhini and she is pleased. She concentrates more on grooming herself and her demands keep rising. Sembattayan futilely tries to make her realise that inner beauty is more important than outer beauty which is just skin deep. Manickam, an agent of the British, comes to Vandicholai for recruiting workers and seeks Sembattayan's help for the same. Sembattayan obliges him, Manickam keeps visiting the village on this work and also learns about Nandhini's longings.

When Nandhini's father invites Sembattayan and Nandhini for a village festival, Sembattayan innocently sends Nandhini on Manickam's motorcycle. Nandhini and Manickam, smitten by each other, get into a physical relationship on the way. Manickam keeps visiting Nandhini regularly without Sembattayan's knowledge. When villagers start to gossip about this extramarital affair, Sembattayan is saddened, but he still trusts Nandhini. He soon learns about Nandhini's pregnancy and is overjoyed, unaware that he is not the father of her child.

The villagers accuse Sembattayan of spoiling the women of Vandicholai by selling fancy items to please his wife and thus imposing city culture on them. One day, he reaches his home before his usual time and hears a man's voice. Through the window, he sees Nandhini and Manickam in a compromising position. Devastated, he remembers his mother's warning that if Nandhini is not controlled, she would be responsible for his destruction, and leaves to drown himself in a pond, while Nandhini contemplates suicide out of guilt. When Sembattayan's corpse is retrieved from the pond, the villagers speculate about the reason for his death differently.

Cast 
 Sivakumar as Sembattayan
 Deepa as Nandhini
 Sivachandran as Manickam
 Vinu as a villager
 Nagarathnamma as Sembattayan's mother
 Heran Ramaswamy
 Loose Mohan as Sembattayan's disciple
 Mani as Sembattayan's disciple

Production 
Vandichakkaram, written by Vinu Chakravarthy, was originally intended to be the 100th film for Sivakumar as an actor; however, after Chakravarthy, director K. Vijayan and producer Thirupur Mani saw the 1978 Kannada film Parasangada Gendethimma, an adaptation of the novella of the same name by Srikrishna Alanahalli, they told Sivakumar that a remake of this film would be a better fit as his 100th film. The remake, titled Rosappu Ravikkaikari, was directed by the duo Devaraj–Mohan and produced by Mani under Vivekananda Pictures. Chakravarthy, credited simply as Vinu, made his debut as an actor in Tamil with this film. He worked on the Kannada original and it was Alanahalli who recommended him for the remake. The screenplay was written by Vijay Krishnaraj (credited as Krishna), making his cinematic debut. T. P. Sekar and R. N. K. Prasad worked as editor and cinematographer respectively. Filming was completed in 45 working days. The last song to be filmed was "Uchi Vaguntheduthu".

Themes 

Rosappu Ravikkaikaris main theme is extramarital affair. In the essay "The Tamil film heroine: from a passive subject to a pleasurable object", published in the book Tamil Cinema: The Cultural Politics of India's Other Film Industry edited Selvaraj Velayutham, Sathiavathi Chinniah writes that films portraying adulterous heroines basically attempt to explore the complexities of womanhood and sexuality, citing Rosappu Ravikkaikari as an example.

Soundtrack 
The soundtrack was composed by Ilaiyaraaja, while the lyrics were written by Pulamaipithan and Gangai Amaran. The song "Maaman Oru Naal" is set in the Carnatic raga known as Harikambhoji (also known as Hari Kambhodhi), while "Yennullil Yengo" is set in the Madhuvanti raga. "Uchi Vaguntheduthu", according to Ilangovan Rajasekaran of Frontline, "brought out the emotions of a man anguished by his wife's infidelity".

Release and reception 
Rosappu Ravikkaikari was released on 18 May 1979. The film received an "A" (adults only) certificate after three cuts. It received critical acclaim, and became a commercial success, running for over 100 days in theatres. The Tamil magazine Ananda Vikatan, in a review dated 27 May 1979, rated the film 50 out of 100, praising Sivakumar's performance and the background score by Ilaiyaraaja. P. S. M. of Kalki lauded Sivakumar's performance, saying he had scored a century with his 100th film. Sivakumar won the Filmfare Award for Best Actor – Tamil.

Legacy 
According to film historian G. Dhananjayan, Rosappu Ravikkaikari became a milestone for "daringly show[ing] infidelity and its consequences on screen for the first time" in Tamil cinema.

References

Bibliography

External links 
 

1970s historical romance films
1970s Tamil-language films
1979 films
Films about adultery in India
Films about infidelity
Films based on adaptations
Films based on Indian novels
Films directed by Devaraj–Mohan
Films scored by Ilaiyaraaja
Films set in the British Raj
Indian historical romance films
Tamil remakes of Kannada films